The  Asian Baseball Championship was the sixth continental tournament held by the Baseball Federation of Asia. The tournament was held in Manila, Philippines for the third time. Won by Japan for the fourth time, it was the first of what would be three consecutive Asian Championship wins in a row; the second such sequence for Japan. Defending champions South Korea (2nd), Taiwan (3rd) and Philippines (4th) were the other participants.

References

Bibliography 
 

Asian Baseball Championship
International baseball competitions hosted by the Philippines
1965 in Philippine sport
Sports competitions in Manila
20th century in Manila